Matt Colton (born 30 March 1975) is an English mastering engineer and member of the mastering  group of the Music Producers Guild.  He has mastered recordings for artists such as Muse, Coldplay, James Blake, George Michael, Hot Chip, Gary Numan, Peter Gabriel, Flume and Erasure.

He began his mastering career as an engineer at Porky's Mastering in London, run by George 'Porky' Peckham in 1997 where he worked with a diverse range of artists from Aphex Twin's Rephlex Records to Kylie Minogue, and has also worked at Optimum Mastering, Alchemy Soho and AIR Studios where he cut the vinyl masters for Coldplay's Mylo Xyloto, remastered George Michael's Faith, and worked on the debut album by James Blake.

In 2012 Colton rejoined Alchemy Mastering as a director and engineer, mastering James Blake's Mercury Prize-winning second album Overgrown, Hot Chip's Why Make Sense?, and Leftfield's Alternative Light Source. Colton is one of the few mastering engineers in the world to offer half speed vinyl mastering, a technique which, although time-consuming, can offer much improved vinyl sound quality. He mastered the vinyl release for the number one album Drones by Muse at half speed, as well as remastering Peter Gabriel's first four solo albums.

Colton was awarded the Music Producers Guild (MPG) Mastering Engineer of the year award in 2013. He has lectured on mastering at various institutions including the London Electronic Music Event, Prism's Mic to Mastering tour, Alchemea College in London, and dBS Music Technology college in Bristol.

Selected discography
 Arca - Xen 2014
 Archie Bronson Outfit - Wild Crush 2014
 Aphex Twin - Selected Ambient Works (remastered) 2013
 Blood Orange - Cupid Deluxe 2013
 Caribou - Our Love 2014
 Cherry Ghost - Herd Runners 2014
 Christine and the Queens - Chaleur Humaine 2014
 Claude VonStroke - Bird Brain 2008
 Coldplay - Mylo Xyloto 2011
 Denai Moore - Elsewhere 2015
 Depeche Mode - Memento Mori 2023
 Dreadzone - Second Light (remastered) 2012
 Drexciya - Harnessed The Storm (remastered) 2015
 Elliott Smith - Elliott Smith 1998
 Erasure - The Neon 2020
 The Feeling - Boy Cried Wolf 2013
 FKA Twigs - EP2 2013
 Flume - Flume 2012
 Flume - Skin 2016
 Four Tet - Morning/Evening 2015
 Foxes - All I Need 2015
 Francois & the Atlas Mountains - Piano Ombre 2014
 Gary Numan - Splinter 2013
 Georgia - Georgia 2015
 George Michael - Faith (remastered) 2011
 Hot Chip - Why Make Sense? 2015
 Jack Colwell - When The World Explodes EP 2016
 JJ DOOM - Key to the Kuffs 2012
 James Blake - Overgrown 2013
 Jimi Goodwin - Odludek 2014
 Kanye West - "Flashing Lights" 2008 
 Låpsley - Hurt me 2015
 Leftfield - Alternative Light Source 2015
 Liars - Mess 2014
 Lee "Scratch" Perry - The Complete Upsetter 1999
 Manic Street Preachers - The Holy Bible (remastered) 2015
 Maoupa Mazzocchetti - A-Tranquility 2014
 Marilina Bertoldi - Prender Un Fuego 2018
 Meat Beat Manifesto - Autoimmune 2008
 Metronomy - Love letters 2014
 Michael Kiwanuka - Kiwanuka (album) 2019
 Misty Miller - Sweet Nothings ep 2015
 Mumford & Sons - Whispers In The Dark 2012
 Muse - Drones 2015
 Neneh Cherry - Blank Project 2014
 New Order - Movement (remastered) 2013
 Nosaj Thing - Fated 2015
 Panda Bear - Crosswords EP 2015
 Peter Gabriel - 1 , 2 , 3 , 4 , 3d , 4d (half speed remasters) 2015
 Seekae - The Worry 2014
 Sleaford Mods - Key Markets 2015
 Small Faces - Ogdens' Nut Gone Flake (remastered) 2013
 Squarepusher - Damogen Furies 2012
 Sunn O))) – Life Metal 2019
 Surgeon - Tresor 97 – 99 (remastered) 2015
 Swans - The Seer 2015
 Swim - Deep Mothers 2015
 T E T S U E - Shortcuts 2019
 TĀLĀ - Malika ep 2015
 Temples - Live in Japan 2014
 Tensnake - Glow 2014
 Thurston Moore - The Best Day 2014
 Twin Peaks – Lookout Low 2019
 V V Brown - Samson & Delilah 2013
 yahyel - "Once / The Flare" 2016
 umru - search result 2018

References

External links
 Discography at Discogs
 MPG Awards winners 2013
 Interview with Juno Download
 Interview with Attack Magazine
 Matt Colton talks about the half speed remasters of Peter Gabriel's 4 solo albums
 Masterclass in Mastering, presentation in Belfast 2010

1975 births
Living people